Lin Yuan-chun (born 5 October 1984) is a professional pool player from Chinese Taipei. 

She started playing at the age of 17. At the 15th Asian Games in 2006, she won the 8 Ball Pool gold medal, narrowly winning 7–6 over Kim Ga-young.

Lin went on to win the WPA Women's World Nine-ball Championship in 2008, again by defeating Kim Ga-young in the final, and was runner-up to Han Yu in the final in 2013.

She has also won medals at the 2009 Asian Indoor Games, 2009 East Asian Games, 2009 World Games and  2010 Asian Games. She won the Amway World Open in 2008 and 2015.

Titles
 2006 Asian Games Eight-ball Singles
 2006 All Japan Championship 9-Ball
 2008 WPA Women's World Nine-ball Championship
 2008 WPA Amway Cup 9-Ball World Open

References

1984 births
Living people
Taiwanese pool players
Female pool players
World champions in pool
Asian Games medalists in cue sports
Cue sports players at the 2010 Asian Games
Cue sports players at the 2006 Asian Games
Medalists at the 2006 Asian Games
Medalists at the 2010 Asian Games
Asian Games gold medalists for Chinese Taipei
Asian Games bronze medalists for Chinese Taipei
21st-century Taiwanese women